Adalbert Kovács (28 September 1920 – August 1999) was a Romanian football player who played as a striker.

Club career
Adalbert Kovács was born on 28 September 1920 in Timișoara, Romania. He started to play football at the junior squads of Electrica Timișoara, afterwards going to play for Chinezul Timișoara where he also started to play at senior level, afterwards going to play in Hungary at second league side, Kaposvár. On 9 March 1947, Kovács made his Divizia A debut, playing for Flamura Roșie Arad in a 5–1 victory in which he scored a hat-trick against Libertatea Oradea, scoring a total of 13 goals in 13 appearances, helping the club win the 1946–47 Divizia A title. In the following season he helped the club win The Double, scoring 19 goals in 26 Divizia A matches, including managing he and teammate Iosif Stibinger to score each a hat-trick on 7 March 1948 in a 6–1 away victory against CSCA București, it was the first time that two players from the same team scored a hat-trick in a Divizia A match and he also scored his team's first goal in the 3–2 victory at the 1948 Cupa României final against CFR Timișoara, thus helping Flamura Roșie Arad win the first Cupa României in the club's history. He won another title with the club in 1950 when he played three games and also helped the The Old Lady win another Cupa României in 1953. After 7 seasons spent at Flamura Roșie Arad, Adalbert Kovács went to play for Locomotiva Timișoara where he made his last Divizia A appearance in a 6–0 loss against CCA București, having a total of 172 Divizia A games played and 80 goals scored. He died at the end of the summer of 1999 at age 78.

International career
Adalbert Kovács played three games at international level for Romania, all of them taking place on the Giulești Stadium from Bucharest, making his debut under coach Ferenc Rónay on 21 September 1947 in a friendly which ended with a 6–2 loss against Czechoslovakia. His following game was also a friendly which ended 0–0 against Poland in which he came as a substitute in the 56th minute in order to replace Ladislau Incze II. Kovács's last appearance for the national team took place on 2 May 1948 in a 1–0 loss against Albania at the 1948 Balkan Cup.

Honours
Flamura Roșie Arad
Divizia A: 1946–47, 1947–48, 1950
Cupa României: 1947–48, 1953

References

External links
 
 Adalbert Kovács at Labtof.ro

1920 births
1999 deaths
Romanian footballers
Romania international footballers
Association football forwards
Liga I players
Nemzeti Bajnokság II
FC CFR Timișoara players
FC UTA Arad players
Kaposvári Rákóczi FC players
Romanian expatriate footballers
Expatriate footballers in Hungary
Romanian expatriate sportspeople in Hungary
Sportspeople from Timișoara